Full Petal Jacket is the seventh album released by surf music band The Surfin' Lungs, released in 2010 on the Spanish label Wild Punk Records and features a rare lead vocal by bassist Steve Dean, who wrote After All This Time about his wife. All 14 tracks are self-penned and they continue in the surf, sun and girls vein which the Lungs have become renowned for. Without the hard, punkier edge of Surf, Drags, Full Petal Jacket is a prime example of how to execute surf pop.

Track listing 
 Surf Bus (Dean, Pearce, Gilling, Weazel) – Lead vocals: Chris Pearce
 Let's Have A Beach Party (Dean, Pearce, Gilling, Weazel) – Lead vocals: Clive Gilling
 The Girls Gone Wild (Dean, Pearce, Gilling, Weazel) – Lead vocals: Chris Pearce
 97XF11 (Dean, Pearce, Gilling, Weazel) – Instrumental
 Out On The Corner (Dean, Pearce, Gilling, Weazel) – Lead vocals: Chris Pearce
 Talk Of The Locker Room (Dean, Pearce, Gilling, Weazel) – Lead vocals: Chris Pearce
 After All This TIme (Dean, Pearce, Gilling, Weazel) – Lead vocals: Steve Dean
 Bubblegum Summer (Dean, Pearce, Gilling, Weazel) – Lead vocals: Clive Gilling
 The Dance With No Name (Dean, Pearce, Gilling, Weazel) – Lead vocals: Chris Pearce
 Umgawa (Dean, Pearce, Gilling, Weazel) – Instrumental
 Perfect Summer (Dean, Pearce, Gilling, Weazel) – Lead vocals: Chris Pearce
 Storm Warning (Dean, Pearce, Gilling, Weazel) – Lead vocals: Chris Pearce
 She's A Surf Punk (Dean, Pearce, Gilling, Weazel) – Lead vocals: Chris Pearce
 The Surf's Up (Dean, Pearce, Gilling, Weazel) – Lead vocals: Chris Pearce

Personnel 
 Chris Pearce – vocals, guitar
 Steve Dean – vocals, bass
 Clive Gilling – vocals, guitar, keyboards
 Sputnik Weazel – vocals, drums, percussion

Producer 
 The Surfin' Lungs

Trivia 
 Former drummer Al Beckett plays the tambourine on Bubblegum Summer.
 Surf Bus was one of the tracks reviewed on Spencer Leigh's Jukebox Jury programme on Radio Merseyside.
 The album was voted the third best release in 2010 on US radio station WITR-FM's Whole Lotta Shakin programme, while it was also record of the week on El Sotano'' on National Radio 3 in Spain.

2010 albums
The Surfin' Lungs albums